Peter Hill (born 4 June 1945) is a British racing cyclist. He rode in the 1967 Tour de France.

References

1945 births
Living people
British male cyclists
Place of birth missing (living people)